The Mocajuba River is a short river in the state of Pará, Brazil. It empties into the Atlantic Ocean.

Course

The village of São João da Ponta lies on the left bank of the river.
The Mocajuba River flows north past the Mocapajuba Marine Extractive Reserve to the west and the São João da Ponta Extractive Reserve to the southeast and the Mãe Grande de Curuçá Extractive Reserve to the east.
An arm of the river, the Furo Maripanema, flows northeast and joins the Curuçá River.

Environment

Vegetation around the Rio Macajuba is almost all forest . 
The area around Rio Macajuba has low population with 19 people per square kilometre.  
The area has a monsoon climate.

See also
List of rivers of Pará

References

Sources

Rivers of Pará